Richard English was an English cricketer. He was a right-handed batsman and a right-arm off-break bowler who played for Suffolk.

English picked up his only List A cricketing appearance for Suffolk in the 1966 Gillette Cup, against Kent.

Batting in the lower order, he scored a duck in the only List A innings in which he batted. He picked up figures of 1-59 with the ball.

He was one of only six Suffolk players to take over 125 wickets and score over two and a half thousand runs.

External links
Richard English at CricketArchive 

English cricketers
Suffolk cricketers